Prescod is a surname. Notable people with the surname include:

 Colin Prescod (born 1944), British sociologist and cultural activist

 Gail Prescod (born 1971), Vincentian sprinter
 Margaret Prescod, activist, author, journalist and radio host
 Nzingha Prescod (born 1992), American female Olympic foil fencer
 Pearl Prescod (1920–1966), Tobagonian actress and singer
 Reece Prescod (born 1996), British sprinter
 Samuel Jackman Prescod (1806–1871), first person of African descent elected to the Parliament of Barbados